This article lists the results for the China PR national football team between 1950 and 1969

1950s

1960s

References
China national football team fixtures and results FIFA.com
Team China official website

1950s in China
1960s in China
1950-69